Menter is a surname. Notable people with the surname include:

Alan Menter (born 1941), British-born South African dermatologist and rugby union footballer
James Menter (1921–2006), British physicist
Sophie Menter (1846–1918), German pianist and composer

See also
Minter (surname)